The results of the 2014 Little League Softball World Series will be determined between August 6 and August 13, 2014 in Portland, Oregon. 10 teams were divided into two groups, both with five teams from the United States and international teams.


All times shown are US EDT.◄

2014 in softball
Little League Softball World Series